Ron Chew (born Ronald A. Chew, May 17, 1953) is an American consultant and community organizer. Chew is a leader in the community based model of museum exhibit development. He lives in Seattle, Washington.

Biography
Chew was born in Seattle and attended Franklin High School and University of Washington.  At the university Chew studied journalism and worked as a reporter at the Daily.  In his senior year he applied for the position of editor but faculty gave the position to a white student who hadn't applied, prompting Chew to formally charge the Daily with discrimination.  Shortly after, Chew left the UW to work at the International Examiner in Seattle's International District.  Ultimately the lawsuit vindicated Chew but he did not return to UW to finish his studies.

Chew began working as a reporter at the Examiner in 1975 and in 1977 he became editor.  During his tenure he covered local events, social concerns and political issues faced by residents of the International District including substandard housing and health care for the poor and elderly and threats to the historic neighborhood from redevelopment.  Chew's connections and involvement in the community through the Examiner honed his skills in community organizing for a cause.

In the late 1980s Chew took on the Chinese Oral History Project, gathering numerous interviews with elderly Chinese Americans.  The project became a traveling exhibit and led to his being recruited as the new director for the struggling Wing Luke Asian Museum (WLAM) in 1991.  Under Chew's leadership, the museum staff developed exhibits collaboratively with community members of varied backgrounds and created programs and displays that addressed and contextualized current issues.

In 2002 the University of Washington recognized Chew's innovative work since leaving college and awarded him an honorary Bachelor of Arts Degree.  In 2004 Chew received the Ford Foundations "Leadership for a Changing World Award" and in 2005 the American Association of Museums included Chew in their "Centennial Honor Roll" for his work recasting the museum as a tool in the fight for social justice.

In 2004 Chew, along with his staff, board and community volunteers, undertook a substantial expansion of WLAM by working toward acquiring a historic building in the International District as a permanent home for the museum.  A successful $23 million capital campaign enabled the museum to purchase and renovate the East Kong Yick Building as their new home, which opened in 2008. At the conclusion of the campaign, Chew stepped down to pursue a new career as a community history consultant.

Since 2008 Chew has owned and operated Chew Communications, a community history and resource development consulting firm in Seattle.  From 2008 to 2010 he was scholar in residence in the museology department at the University of Washington. He also served as executive director of the International Community Health Services Foundation in Seattle, to maintain access to affordable health care in the community, retiring at the end of 2020.

Chew's recent publications include Community-Based Arts Organizations: A New Center of Gravity  through Americans for the Arts outlining the emerging centrality of arts organizations as change agents in communities. in 2009 and Remembering Silme Domingo and Gene Viernes: The Legacy of Filipino American Labor Activism in 2012.  Chew's autobiography, My Unforgotten Seattle, was published in fall 2020.

Bibliography

See also
Wing Luke Asian Museum
International District
International Examiner 
Ecomuseum

References

External links

Chew Communications
International Community Health Services Foundation
Ron Chew oral history interview at the Seattle Civil Rights and Labor History Project
University of Washington Museology
Wing Luke Museum

1953 births
American journalists of Chinese descent
Living people
People from Seattle
University of Washington College of Arts and Sciences alumni
The Daily of the University of Washington alumni
Franklin High School (Seattle) alumni